Haya Rashed Al-Khalifa (born October 18, 1952) is a lawyer and diplomat from Bahrain. As ambassador to France 1999-2004 she became Bahrain's first ever female ambassador. She is one of the first women to practice law in Bahrain, and the third ever woman to preside at the UN General Assembly.

Legal career
Haya obtained a Bachelor of Law degree from the University of Kuwait in 1974. She has also obtained a Diploma in Civil Rights Private Law from the University of Alexandria, Egypt, in 1986 and a Diploma in Comparative Law from the Ain Shams University, Egypt, in 1988.

With Lulwa Al Awadhi, she was one of the first two women in Bahrain to practice law when she was admitted as a lawyer in Bahrain in 1979. She set up her own practise and is the founder of the Haya Rashed Al Khalifa Law Firm. From 1997 to 1999, she was the vice chairwoman of the International Bar Association. She is the legal advisor to Bahrain's royal court and is a Global Advisors to Orphans International.

Diplomatic career
Haya was the President of the 61st session of the United Nations General Assembly which began on September 12, 2006, and closed on September 17, 2007. She was the third woman to hold the position since Vijaya Lakshmi Pandit of India and Angie Elisabeth Brooks of Liberia were appointed to the presidency in 1953 and 1969 respectively.  She was elected by acclamation after Bahrain was chosen as its candidate by the group of Asian nations. In addition to being the first woman president since 1969, Haya was the first woman Muslim president.

She was the Bahraini ambassador to France from 1999 to 2004. When she was appointed Ambassador to France in 1999 she became the first ever female Bahraini ambassador. She also served as a permanent delegate to the UN Educational, Scientific and Cultural Organization (UNESCO).

The move was the first in a series of appointments of women to high-profile government positions in recent years, which have included the country's first female cabinet minister, Nada Haffadh, and six women nominated to the Shura Council, the upper house of parliament.

On the same day (6 June 2006) that Haya was selected to preside at the UN, Mona Al Kawari became the first female judge in Bahrain.

Family and background
Haya is a member of the ruling Al Khalifa family of Bahrain. She is the great-granddaughter of Isa ibn Ali Al Khalifa, who ruled Bahrain from 1869 to 1932. The present head of the family, King Hamad ibn Isa Al Khalifa, is the great-great-grandson of Isa ibn Ali.

Appointments and awards
Sheika Haya has received the following awards:
 United Nations Millennium Development Goals Special Award, 2007
 Path to Peace Award 2007
 Social Creativity Award, at the Sixth Conference of the Arab Thought Foundation.

Sheikha Haya is a member of the following bodies:
 World Intellectual Property Organisation Arbitration Committee  
 International Chamber of Commerce (ICC)  
 International Court of Arbitration 
 Bahrain Supreme Council of Culture, Arts & Literature  
 Bahrain Bar Association (Vice-Chair)  
 Bahrain Chamber for Dispute Resolution (Chairperson of the Board of Trustees)
 Consumer Advisory Group of the Telecommunications Regulatory Authority, Bahrain (Chair).

See also
 First women lawyers around the world
 Women's political rights in Bahrain
 Dr Nada Haffadh, Bahrain's Minister of Health and first female cabinet member (appointed 2004)

References

External links
"Outgoing General Assembly president urges more dialogue among civilizations," UN News Centre, September 17, 2007.
Election of the President of the United Nations General Assembly  United Nations
"Bahraini woman diplomat to become UN General Assembly Prez". Press Trust of India. Hindustan Times. June 8, 2006.
"A date 'to remember with pride'". Habib Toumi. Gulf News. June 8, 2006.
"Bahraini woman becomes UN General Assembly president". Zee News. June 8, 2006.
 UN General Assembly to be headed by its third-ever woman president, UN.org, June 8, 2006.
 Lawyer vows to strengthen UN, Daily Telegraph (Australia), July 5, 2006
Haya Rashed Al Khalifa Law Firm

1952 births
Living people
Bahraini Muslims
Haya Rashed Al-Khalifa
Presidents of the United Nations General Assembly
Bahraini diplomats
Bahraini lawyers
Permanent Representatives of Bahrain to the United Nations
Permanent Delegates of Bahrain to UNESCO
Ambassadors of Bahrain to France
Bahraini women diplomats
Kuwait University alumni
Alexandria University alumni
Ain Shams University alumni
Women ambassadors